Bekoratsaka is a town and commune in Madagascar. It belongs to the district of Mampikony, which is a part of Sofia Region. The population of the commune was estimated to be approximately 32,000 in 2001 commune census.

Primary and junior level secondary education are available in town. The majority 55% of the population of the commune are farmers, while an additional 40% receives their livelihood from raising livestock. The most important crops are rice and seeds of catechu, while other important agricultural products are bananas, cassava and cowpeas.  Services provide employment for 4% of the population. Additionally fishing employs 1% of the population.

References and notes 

Populated places in Sofia Region